Nymphargus is a genus of glass frogs in the subfamily Centroleninae, which was established in 2007. They are distributed in the Andean slopes of Colombia, Ecuador, Peru, and Bolivia. They are characterized by lacking webbing among the outer fingers, lacking humeral spines in adult males, and having a lobed liver covered by a transparent hepatic peritoneum. They can be more specifically characterized as having a head that is darker green than the body, there being yellow spots surrounded by black on head and body, upper eyelids are dark lavender. The conservation status of the Nymphargus frogs was largely believed to be critically endangered due to the minimal research done on this genus. Once the scope of the research was broadened the conservation status was able to be determined as being vulnerable. More frogs of different variations were found increasing the genus’ population.

Species
Most species were moved here from Cochranella. As of 2019, the genus contains 38 species:

Footnotes

References
  (2007): Revision of the characters of Centrolenidae (Amphibia: Anura: Athesphatanura), with comments on its taxonomy and the description of new taxa of glassfrogs. Zootaxa 1572: 1-82. PDF fulltext
 
  (2012): A new cryptic species of glassfrog (Centrolenidae: Nymphargus) from Reserva Las Gralarias, Ecuador. Zootaxa 3257: 1-21. PDF Excerpt

 
Glass frogs
Amphibians of South America
Amphibian genera